Boro (बर'/बड़ो ), also called Bodo, is the largest ethnolinguistic group in the Assam state of India. They are a part of the greater Bodo-Kachari family of ethnolinguistic groups and are spread across northeastern India. They are concentrated mainly in the Bodoland Territorial Region of Assam, though Boros inhabit all other districts of Assam and Meghalaya.

Boros were listed under both "Boro" and "Borokachari" in The Constitution (Scheduled Tribes) Order, 1950, and are continued to be so called in Census of India documents. Boros speak the Boro language, a Boro-Garo language of the Tibeto-Burman family, which is recognised as one of twenty-two Scheduled languages of India. Over two-thirds of the people are bilingual, speaking Assamese as second language. The Boro along with other cognate groups of Bodo-Kachari peoples are prehistoric settlers who are believed to have migrated at least 3000 years ago. Boros are mostly settled farmers, who have traditional irrigation, dong.

The Boro people are recognised as a plains tribe in the Sixth Schedule of the Indian Constitution, and have special powers in the Bodoland Territorial Region, an autonomous division; and also as a minority people.

Etymology
Boro is the self-designation or autonym of the community. Boro comes from Bara-fisa, which means "son of Bara", and Bara stands for "man" or "male member" of the group. In the cognate language Kokborok, Borok means man ('k' being a suffix for nouns) and so logically, Boro would mean man even in the Boro language. Generally, the word Boro means a man, in the wider sense Boro means a human being (but not specific to a female member of the family) in the languages used by the Bodo-Kachari peoples.

History
After the breakup of Kamarupa around the 12th century till the colonial times (19th century) and beyond different groups that included the Boro people settled in different ecological regions but the constant movements of peoples led to the development of distinctive but hybrid cultural practices. Due to the expansion  of these states and the expansion of tenured peasantry, the Boros finally converged close to the forested regions of the lower Himalayan foothills.

In this habitat, the Boros practised shifting cultivation for self-sustenance and controlled forest products. To cultivate in this difficult terrain the Boros developed innovative low-cost irrigation systems that supported shifting cultivation. Landholding, sowing and harvesting, irrigation, and hunting were all performed collectively.  As those who controlled forest based produce, they emerged as intermediaries in the trade in these as well as other goods between the plains and the hills and complex relationships developed. The Boros remained shifting cultivators at least till the 18th century and then slowly became less mobile; even during the colonial period, most Boros refused permanent land tenure or made no effort to secure landholding documents.

When the Koch kingdom consolidated its rule in the 16th century into the regions that the Boro people had settled in, it demarcated the region north of the Gohain Kamal Ali—which came to be called the Duars—as the region where non-Brahmin culture could thrive.  The Ahoms too made special arrangements with Bhutan in the 17th/18th centuries to share administrative and fiscal responsibilities.  But when the British banned forest lands from being used for cultivation in the last quarter of the 19th century the Boros suffered a major habitat loss since the forest lands historically used for shifting cultivation and the source of other produce suddenly became unavailable to them.  To alienate indigenous peasants from their lands was a stated colonial aim, to make them available as labour in other enterprises.

Boro identity formation
Boros identity formation began in the colonial period, when the Boro elite and intelligentsia began differentiating themselves from the Assamese caste-Hindu society. The Boro, as well as many other communities as also much of the indigenous elite, were not exposed to education till the end of the 19th century, and it was by the early 20th century when a class of Boro/Kachari publicists finally emerged—a small Kachari elite formed in the early 20th century from among traders, school teachers and contractors.  Foremost among them was Kalicharan Brahma, a trader from Goalpara who established a new monotheistic faith called "Brahma-ism" and most importantly, claimed for himself and his peers a new Bodo Identity. Whereas earlier the only avenue for social mobility was conversion into a low-caste Hindu group, the Boros have now created an additional avenue that was respectful and independent, and by the 1921 census the Boros began giving up their tribal names and identifying themselves as Boro by caste and language and Brahma by religion.  Additional avenues, via conversion to Christianity, were already available by the late 19th century especially with the evangelical work of Sidney Endle who is also known for his tome "The Kacharis", and this formed a parallel stream of Boro articulation till much later times.

Bodo was a term first reported by Brian Houghton Hodgson (1847) as a endonym that, he speculated, encompassed a wide group of peoples, and this notion of a wide group was picked up by Kalicharan Brahma and his peers.  In parallel there were those like Jadunath Khakhlari who rejected Bodo as a neologism, and emphasized the use of the name Kachari instead and pointed to the contributions of the Kachari language to Assamese to lay claim to it and to the political legacy of the past.  Those of the Kacharis who preferred to progress socially by initiation into the Ekasarana Dharma are called Sarania Kachari and are not considered as Boros today.

Pre-political Boro associations
The period from 1919 saw the emergence of different Boro organizations: Bodo Chatra Sanmilan (Bodo Students Association), Kachari Chatra Sanmilan (Kachari Students Association), Bodo Maha Sanmilan (Greater Bodo Association), Kachari Jatiyo Sanmilan (Kachari Community Association), etc.  These organizations pushed divergent means for social and political progress.  For example, Bodo Chatra Sanmilan advocated giving up tribal attributes and wanted women to follow the ideals of Sita of Ramayana.   Even as self-assertive politics was on, the Boros were not ready to severe their relationship with the greater Assamese society, with even Kalicharan Brahma advocating Assamese as the medium of instruction in schools, and Boro associations seeking patronage from Assamese figures who showed sympathy for their cause.  In the absence of an acknowledged past history of state formation, the associations felt particularly pressed to show that the Boros were not primitive as some other tribal groups and at the same time did not fall into the caste-Hindu hierarchy.

The demand for community rights was made for the first time when at the 1929 Simon Commission the Boro leaders evoked colonial imagery of backward tribes and requested protection in the form of reserved representation in local and central legislatures. The Boro delegation to the Simon Commission included, among others, Kalicharan Brahma and Jadav Khakhlari.  The delegation submitted that Goalpara should remain with Assam and should not be included with Bengal; and that the Boros were culturally close to the Assamese.

Boros in colonial tribal politics
Tribe, and Plains Tribes, were new social categories introduced by the colonial authorities—the only human category in the pre-colonial times was jati—and the elites from these social groups, including that from the Boros, used these categories for political articulation.  The Tribal League, a full political organisation, emerged in 1933 as the common platform for all plains tribes of the Brahmaputra valley. This formation excluded the hills tribes which were not allowed political participation. The Tribal League, which included Boro leaders such as Rabi Chandra Kachari and Rupnath Brahma, succeeded in protecting the Line system in 1937 against the proposal by the Muslim League.

Language

The Boro language is a member of the Sino-Tibetan language family. It belongs to the Boro–Garo group of the Tibeto-Burman languages branch of the Sino-Tibetan family. It is an official language of the state of Assam and the Bodoland Territorial Region of India. It is also one of the twenty-two languages listed in the Eighth Schedule of the Constitution of India.

Religion
Traditionally, Boros practised Bathouism, which is the worshiping of supreme God, known as Obonglaoree. The shijou tree (in the genus Euphorbia) is taken as the symbol of Bathou and worshiped. It is also claimed as the supreme god. In the Boro language, Ba means five and thou means deep. Since Boros believe in the five mighty elements of God – land, water, air, fire, and ether – the number five has become significant in the Bathou culture, which is similar to the five elements of other Asian religions.

According to Bathouism, before the creation of the universe there was simply a great void, in which the supreme being 'Aham Guru', Anan Binan Gosai or Obonglaoree existed formlessly. Aham Guru became tired of living a formless existence and desired to live in flesh and blood. He descended on this great void with all human characteristics and created the universe.

In addition to Bathouism, Boro people have also been converted to Hinduism, especially Hoom Jaygya. For this worship through fire ceremony, a clean surface near a home or courtyard is prepared. Usually, worship offerings include a betel nut called a 'goi' and a betel leaf called a 'phathwi'  and rice, milk, and sugar. Another important Hindu festival, the Kherai Puja, where an altar is placed in a rice field, is the most important festival of the Boros. However, caste and dowry practices are not practised by the majority of Boro Hindus, who follow a set of rules called Brahma Dharma.

Christianity is followed by around 10% of the Boros and is predominantly of the Baptist denomination. The major Boro Churches associations are the Boro Baptist Convention and Boro Baptist Church Association

Folk tradition and mythology
The history of the Boro people can be explained from folk traditions. According to Padma Bhushan winner Suniti Kumar Chatterjee, mythologically, Boros are "the offspring of son of the Vishnu (Baraha) and Mother-Earth (Basumati)" who were termed "Kiratas" during the Epic period.

Social groups
Aroi or Ari or Ary is a suffix in Boro language, which means folk.

Some of the important clans of Boros are:
Swargiary: The priestly clan, with Deoris and Ojhas selected from this clan.
Basumatary: The land-holding clan. 
Narzary: The clan associated with the jute cultivation and supply.
Mosahary: This clan is associated with the protection of cattle.
Goyary: This clan is associated with the cultivation of areca nuts.
Owary: This clan is associated with the supply of bamboos.
Khakhlary: This clan is associated with the supply of Khangkhala plant required for kherai puja.
Daimary: This clan is associated with the river.
Lahari: This clan is associated with the collection of leaves in large quantities for the festival.
Hajoary: The Boros that lived in the hills and foothills.
Kherkatari: The Boros associated with thatch and its supply, found mostly in Kamrup district.
Sibingari: The Boros traditionally associated with raising and supply of sesame.
Bingiari: The Boros associated with musical instruments.
Ramchiary: Ramsa is place name in kamrup. It is the name by which Boros were known to their brethren in the hills.
Mahilary: This clan is associated with collection of tax from Mahallas. Mahela and Mahalia are the variant forms of Mahilary clan.

Gallery

Notable people

 Rajni Basumatary Filmmaker and actress
 Ankushita Boro, Indian boxer
 Jamuna Boro, Indian boxer
 Pramod Boro, Former President of ABSU, President of UPPL, CEM of Bodoland Territorial Council
 Harishankar Brahma 19th Chief Election Commissioner of India
 Upendra Nath Brahma, Boro activist, known by the title Bodofa
 Sansuma Khunggur Bwiswmuthiary, former Member of parliament
 Hagrama Mohilary, president of Bodoland People's Front political party and former Chief Executive Member of Bodoland Territorial Council.
 Ranjit Shekhar Mooshahary, former governor of Meghalaya, retired IPS officer, former director-general of National Security Guards (NSG) and the Border Security Force (BSF)
 Halicharan Narzary, Indian footballer 
 Proneeta Swargiary Dance India Dance (season 5) Winner

See also
 Bodo Sahitya Sabha
 Bodo culture
 Ual (tool)

References

Bibliography

Further reading

External links

Ethnic groups in Northeast India
Tribes of Assam
Sino-Tibetan-speaking people
Bodo-Kachari

Hindu ethnic groups
Social groups of Assam
Ethnic groups in South Asia
Linguistic groups of the constitutionally recognised official languages of India